The following is a list of National Women's Soccer League (NWSL) draftees by college soccer team.

Composed of four rounds, the NWSL Draft is a mechanism by which NWSL franchises are able to select college athletes from the NCAA and the NAIA who are in their senior season in college or have exhausted their collegiate eligibility.

As of the 2023 NWSL Draft, there have been 434 players from 96 different schools selected since the inception of the NWSL Draft (formerly called the NWSL College Draft) in 2013. The UCLA Bruins hold the all-time record for most players drafted with 22 players. 25 schools have had only one player selected. The most selections from one college team in a single draft is six, achieved by both the UCLA Bruins in 2015 and Duke Blue Devils in 2018. The Virginia Cavaliers and Stanford Cardinal remain the only teams to have players drafted in all 11 NWSL Drafts.

39 college teams have had at least one player drafted in the first round. Florida State Seminoles and Stanford Cardinal hold the all-time record for first round picks with 10 in total. The most first-round picks from one college team in a single draft is three which has happened on five occasions: UCLA Bruins in 2015, Florida State Seminoles in both 2016 and 2023, USC Trojans in 2017 and Stanford Cardinal in 2019. Five colleges have produced first overall picks: Stanford Cardinal (4), North Carolina Tar Heels (2), Virginia Cavaliers (2), UCLA Bruins (1) and Wisconsin Badgers (1). In 2023, Alyssa Thompson became the first high school player selected in an NWSL Draft when she was taken first overall out of Harvard-Westlake School (1).

Alabama Crimson Tide

Arizona Wildcats

Arizona State Sun Devils

Arkansas Razorbacks

Auburn Tigers

Baylor Bears

Boston College Eagles

Boston University Terriers

Bowling Green Falcons

Butler Bulldogs

BYU Cougars

Cal State Fullerton Titans

California Golden Bears

Clemson Tigers

Colorado Buffaloes

Colorado College Tigers

Dayton Flyers

Denver Pioneers

DePaul Blue Demons

Duke Blue Devils

Florida Gators

Florida State Seminoles

Georgetown Hoyas

Georgia Bulldogs

Gonzaga Bulldogs

Grand Canyon Antelopes

Harvard Crimson

Hofstra Pride

Illinois Fighting Illini

Illinois State Redbirds

Iowa State Cyclones

James Madison Dukes

Kansas Jayhawks

Kansas State Wildcats

Kentucky Wildcats

Long Beach State Beach

Louisville Cardinals

Loyola Ramblers

LSU Tigers

Marquette Golden Eagles

Maryland Terrapins

Michigan Wolverines

Michigan State Spartans

Minnesota Golden Gophers

Mississippi State Bulldogs

Missouri State Lady Bears

Missouri Tigers

NC State Wolfpack

Nebraska Cornhuskers

New Mexico Lobos

North Carolina Tar Heels

Northeastern Huskies

Northern Colorado Bears

Northwestern Wildcats

Notre Dame Fighting Irish

Ohio State Buckeyes

Oklahoma State Cowgirls

Ole Miss Rebels

Oregon Ducks

Oregon State Beavers

Penn State Nittany Lions

Pepperdine Waves

Portland Pilots

Princeton Tigers

Purdue Boilermakers

Rutgers Scarlet Knights

San Francisco Dons

Santa Clara Broncos

Seattle Redhawks

South Carolina Gamecocks

South Florida Bulls

St. John's Red Storm

Stanford Cardinal

TCU Horned Frogs

Texas A&M Aggies

Texas Longhorns

Texas Tech Red Raiders

UC Irvine Anteaters

UCF Knights

UCLA Bruins

UConn Huskies

UNC Wilmington Seahawks

USC Trojans

Utah Utes

Vanderbilt Commodores

Villanova Wildcats

Virginia Cavaliers

Virginia Tech Hokies

Wake Forest Demon Deacons

Washington Huskies

Washington State Cougars

West Virginia Mountaineers

William & Mary Tribe

Wisconsin Badgers

Yale Bulldogs

Non-college athletes

References 

List of draftees by college
Draftees